Linda Sue Schadler is the Dean of the College of Engineering and Mathematical Sciences at the University of Vermont. Her research investigates the mechanical, optical and electric behaviour of polymer composites. She is a Fellow of the Materials Research Society and ASM International.

Early life and education 
Schadler grew up in Niskayuna, New York. Her father worked in metallurgy at General Electric and her mother was a biology professor at Union College. Schadler graduated top of her high school class.  She studied materials science at Cornell University and graduated in 1985. She moved to the University of Pennsylvania for her doctoral research, working on the micromechanical behavior of fiber / polymer composites.

Research and career 
After her PhD, Schadler was a postdoctoral researcher at the Thomas J. Watson Research Center.  Schadler was appointed to the faculty at Drexel University in 1992. She moved to Rensselaer Polytechnic Institute in 1996, where she served on the faculty for twenty two years. In 2012 she was made Russell Sage Professor. Her research at the Rensselaer Polytechnic Institute included studies into polymer composites and other two-phase systems. She eventually became Vice Provost and Dean of Undergraduate Education. Schadler created a video called Molecules to the Max, which introduces the general public to materials science. She created the beta classroom, an experimental space for novel teaching, as well as a seed fund for pedagogical innovation.

In 2018 Schadler moved to the University of Vermont, where she was made Dean of Engineering and Mathematical Sciences. She was awarded a $5 million grant to create a database of polymer nanocomposites and metamaterials that will permit researchers to predict the properties of new materials. At Vermont Schadler looks to ensure scientists and engineers receive training in the humanities.

Awards and honours 
 1994 National Science Foundation National Young Investigator 
 1997 ASM International Bradley Staughton Award
 1998 ASM International Fellow
 2011 Elected trustee of the ASM International
 2016 Elected a fellow of the Materials Research Society
 2019 Appointed to the MRS Board of Directors

Selected publications

Personal life 
Schadler is married to Tom Feist, with whom she has two children.

References 

Living people
Year of birth missing (living people)
University of Pennsylvania alumni
American materials scientists
University of Vermont faculty
Cornell University alumni